Roccagiovine (in Romanesco simply known as ) is a  (municipality) in the Metropolitan City of Rome in the Italian region of Latium, located about  northeast of Rome. It is included in the Natural Park of the Monti Lucretili.

The ancient town was known by the Romans as Fanum Vacunae.

A Roman inscription found here enabled identification of Horace's Villa nearby.

Twin towns
 Dampierre-lès-Conflans, France

References

Cities and towns in Lazio